Elias Dib (Arabic: إلياس ديب) was a writer and a visual artist.

Education 
Dib was born in 1945 and received his doctorate degree in 2003 in visual sciences and arts from the Sorbonne University in Paris. He also received his master's and bachelor's degrees from the same university. In the early seventies, he obtained a diploma from the National Institute of Fine Arts at the Lebanese University in Beirut.

Career 
Since 1994 he had worked as a teacher at the Art Institute of  the American University.  Dib also worked on making the basic designs for a number of Arab magazines.

From 1994 to 1998, he was teaching at the Doctoral Institute and at the Lebanese University, and taught there again from 2004 to 2010.

Works 
The magical device (Arabic title: الأداة السحرية: قراءات في كف جبران) was the title of the book that  Dib wrote in order to analyze the artworks of the international Lebanese poet and prose writer Gubran Khalil Gubran.

References 

Arab artists
Lebanese writers